The 1933 Wimbledon Championships took place on the outdoor grass courts at the All England Lawn Tennis and Croquet Club in Wimbledon, London, United Kingdom. The tournament was held from Monday 26 June until Saturday 8 July 1933. It was the 53rd staging of the Wimbledon Championships, and the third Grand Slam tennis event of 1933. Jack Crawford and Helen Moody won the singles titles.

Finals

Men's singles

 Jack Crawford defeated  Ellsworth Vines, 4–6, 11–9, 6–2, 2–6, 6–4

Women's singles

 Helen Moody defeated  Dorothy Round, 6–4, 6–8, 6–3

Men's doubles

 Jean Borotra /  Jacques Brugnon defeated  Ryosuke Nunoi /  Jiro Sato, 4–6, 6–3, 6–3, 7–5

Women's doubles

 Simonne Mathieu /  Elizabeth Ryan defeated  Freda James /  Billie Yorke, 6–2, 9–11, 6–4

Mixed doubles

 Gottfried von Cramm /  Hilde Krahwinkel defeated  Norman Farquharson /   Mary Heeley, 7–5, 8–6

References

External links
 Official Wimbledon Championships website

 
Wimbledon Championships
Wimbledon Championships
Wimbledon Championships
Wimbledon Championships